Vigilio Fait (born 14 October 1962 in Rovereto, Trentino) is an Italian sport shooter. Since 1997, Fait had won a total of ten medals (three golds, four silver, and three bronze) for both air and free pistol at the ISSF World Cup series. He also captured a silver medal in the men's 50 m pistol at the 2006 ISSF World Shooting Championships in Zagreb, Croatia, accumulating a score of 662.8 points. Fait is a four-time Olympian, and a member of Revereto National Shooting Club under his coach Giancarlo Tosi.

Fait made his official debut for the 1996 Summer Olympics in Atlanta, Georgia, representing his nation Italy. He achieved a fifth-place finish in the 50 m pistol, and a seventeenth-place finish in the 10 m air pistol, accumulating scores of 659.8 and 578 points, respectively. Fait also competed at the 2000 Summer Olympics in Sydney, and at the 2004 Summer Olympics in Athens, but he neither reached the final round, nor claimed an Olympic medal.

Twelve years after competing in his first Olympics, Fait qualified for his fourth Italian team, as a 46-year-old, at the 2008 Summer Olympics in Beijing by placing second in men's free pistol from the World Championships. He scored a total of 580 targets in the preliminary rounds of the men's 10 m air pistol, by one point ahead of Bulgarian shooter and two-time Olympic champion Tanyu Kiryakov from the final attempt, finishing only in ninth place. Three days later, Fait placed twenty-eighth in his second event, 50 m pistol, by one point behind North Korea's Ryu Myong-Yon from the final attempt, with a total score of 551 targets.

Olympic results

References

External links
NBC 2008 Olympics profile

Italian male sport shooters
Living people
Olympic shooters of Italy
Shooters at the 1996 Summer Olympics
Shooters at the 2000 Summer Olympics
Shooters at the 2004 Summer Olympics
Shooters at the 2008 Summer Olympics
People from Rovereto
1962 births
Sportspeople from Trentino